John Baddeley may refer to:

Jack Baddeley (1881–1953), born John Marcus Baddeley, Australian politician and member of the New South Wales Legislative Assembly
Sir John Baddeley, 1st Baronet (1842–1926), English baronet and 593rd Lord Mayor of London
John Baddeley, 2nd, 3rd and 4th Baronets, of the Baddeley baronets
 John F. Baddeley (1854–1940), British traveller, scholar and journalist, best known by his works on Russia and the Caucasus region.

See also 
Baddeley
 Jon Baddeley, British TV personality, regular contributor to the Antiques Roadshow